5 Million Money Drop is a Sri Lankan game show currently airing on Sirasa TV in Sri Lanka. It is based on the original UK series The Million Pound Drop (now known as The £100K Drop). The show first aired on 13 August 2022.

Format
A team of two people with a pre-existing relationship are presented with LKR 5 million in 5,000 rupee notes, banded in 50 bundles of Rs.100,000 each. The team is presented with seven general knowledge multiple-choice questions during the course of the game, with the number of options decreasing as the game progresses; the first three questions have four options, while the next three questions have three options, and the final question has only two options.

The contestants choose one of two categories at the beginning of each round. Each option corresponds with a different trapdoor or "drop"; only one answer is correct. The contestants have a fixed amount of time to distribute all the money amongst the trapdoors as they see fit; however, it is compulsory to leave at least one trapdoor clear, meaning at least one answer should have no money allocated. Bundles that are not placed on any drop once time runs out are forfeited.

After the timer either runs out or is stopped, the trapdoors for the incorrect answers are opened; any money placed on them falls down a chute and is removed from the game, while any money placed on the correct answer is carried forward to the next question. This process is repeated until the team runs out of money and loses, or until the final question. If contestants answer all questions correctly, they win the remaining money.

The time limits and number of options for each question are as follows:

Quick Change
Contestants are able to use the "Quick Change" option only once during the game on any of the first six questions. When a "Quick Change" is used, contestants are given an additional 30 seconds to reallocate any money to any other answers. If contestants do not leave a single answer without money or did not place all their money before time is up, Quick Change will automatically be used, however, if "Quick Change" was already used earlier in the game, the team is disqualified.

References

External links 
 5 Million Money Drop On YouTube

Sri Lankan television shows
Television game shows
2022 Sri Lankan television series debuts
Sirasa TV original programming